Gediminas Vičius (born 5 July 1985 in Kaunas) is a Lithuanian footballer who plays as a midfielder, currently for FC Vilniaus Vytis in the I Lyga and the Lithuania national football team.

Career

Club
In 2005, he signed for Lithuanian outfit FK Šilutė where he made 69 appearances scoring 8 goals over 4 seasons.

During the 2008 season he transferred to the famous A Lyga club FBK Kaunas. He played there for two seasons and managed to make 2 appearances in the UEFA Europa League.

In 2010, he transferred to Kazakhstan Premier League club Shakhter Karagandy where he has since featured regularly in the league and in European club competition.

On 18 February 2015, Vičius signed for FC Zhetysu.

International
On 11 October 2011, he made his debut for the Lithuania national football team in a UEFA Euro 2012 qualifying Group I match against the Czech Republic.

Career statistics

International

Statistics accurate as of match played 14 June 2015

International goals

References

External links

1985 births
Living people
Lithuanian footballers
Lithuania international footballers
Lithuanian expatriate footballers
Kazakhstan Premier League players
FC Shakhter Karagandy players
FBK Kaunas footballers
FC Zhetysu players
Expatriate footballers in Kazakhstan
Sportspeople from Kaunas
FK Šilutė players
Association football midfielders